Akitomo (written:  or ) is a masculine Japanese given name. Notable people with the name include:

, Japanese gymnast
, Japanese basketball player and coach

Japanese masculine given names